Iamblichus was an Ancient Greek Neoplatonic philosopher of Apameia (Syria), and a contemporary of the emperor Julian the Apostate (331–363) and Libanius. He was thought to have committed suicide during the last year of Valens' reign (378 CE).

He is often confused with Iamblichus Chalcidensis but the time at which he lived, and his intimacy with Julian, show that he belongs to a later date. The emperor, where he speaks of him, bestows extravagant praise upon him.

References

Footnotes

4th-century philosophers
Neoplatonists
Ancient Roman philosophers
Syrian philosophers